Biggar is a surname of Scottish origin. People with the surname include:

 Alastair Biggar (1946–2016), Scottish rugby union player
 Alexander Biggar (disambiguation), multiple people
 Ann-Maree Biggar (born 1962), Australian television presenter
 Billy Biggar (1874–1935), English footballer
 Dan Biggar (born 1989), Welsh rugby union player
 Helen Biggar (1909–1953), Scottish sculptor and filmmaker
 Henry Percival Biggar (1872–1938), Canadian historian
 Herbert Biggar (1809–1892), Canadian merchant and politician
 James Lyons Biggar (1824–1879), Canadian merchant and politician
 James Lyons Biggar (1856–1922), Canadian soldier
 John Biggar (Scottish politician) (1874–1943), Scottish politician
 John Walter Scott Biggar (1843–1897), Canadian farmer and politician
 Joseph Biggar (c. 1828–1890), Irish politician
 Kyle Biggar (born 1986), Scottish biologist
 Margaret Catherine Biggar Blaikie (1823-1915), Scottish temperance reformer
 Mike Biggar (born 1949), Scottish rugby union player
 Murray Biggar, Canadian politician
 Nigel Biggar (born 1955), British theologian and priest
 Oliver Mowat Biggar (1876–1948), Canadian lawyer and civil servant
 Paula Biggar, Canadian politician
 Sanford Dennis Biggar, Canadian politician
 William Hodgins Biggar (1852–1922), Canadian lawyer and politician

See also
 Baldwin of Biggar, mid 12th century Scottish magnate
 Biggar family, pioneer traders at Port Natal in the early 19th century
 Bigger (disambiguation)

References

Scottish toponymic surnames